István Géczi (16 March 1944 – 10 September 2018) was a Hungarian football goalkeeper, who played for Ferencvárosi TC.

He won a silver medal in football at the 1972 Summer Olympics, and also participated in the 1966 FIFA World Cup and UEFA Euro 1972 for the Hungary national football team.

Following the end of his career, he worked as a teacher and was a member of the Hungarian Parliament in the late 1980s.

Sources
 Ki kicsoda a magyar sportéletben?, I. kötet (A–H). Szekszárd, Babits Kiadó, 1994, 377. o.,  
 Rejtő László–Lukács László–Szepesi György: Felejthetetlen 90 percek (Sportkiadó, 1977)  
 Nagy Béla: Fradisták (Sportpropaganda, 1981)  
 Nagy Béla: Fradi futballkönyv (Sportpropaganda, 1985)  
 Dénes Tamás – Rochy Zoltán: A Kupagyőztesek Európa-kupája története (Budapest, 2000)

References

External links 
 
 

1944 births
2018 deaths
Association football goalkeepers
Hungarian footballers
Hungary international footballers
Ferencvárosi TC footballers
1966 FIFA World Cup players
UEFA Euro 1972 players
Olympic footballers of Hungary
Footballers at the 1972 Summer Olympics
Olympic silver medalists for Hungary
Olympic medalists in football
Medalists at the 1972 Summer Olympics
Members of the National Assembly of Hungary (1985–1990)
People from Borsod-Abaúj-Zemplén County